Paul Andrew Ormerod (born 20 March 1950) is a British economist who is a partner at Volterra Partners consultancy. Additionally, he is a visiting professor at UCL Centre for Decision Making Uncertainty.

Research
Ormerod has researched complexity, complex systems, nonlinear feedback, the boom and bust cycle of business and economic competition. He uses a multidisciplinary approach, making use of biology, physics, mathematics, statistics and psychology as sources of results that can be applied to economics.

Biography
Ormerod was born in Rochdale. After leaving Manchester Grammar School, he completed his undergraduate economic studies at Christ's College, Cambridge, and his postgraduate studies at St Catherine's College, Oxford, for which he was awarded a Master of Philosophy (MPhil) in economics. Upon graduation he worked as a forecaster at the National Institute of Economic and Social Research.

In 1994, his book The Death of Economics was released. The book criticised mainstream economic practice, and made suggestions for reform.

He has founded several companies including the Henley Centre and Volterra Partners. The Henley Centre was later sold to a FTSE100 company. Volterra Partners was founded in 1998 with Bridget Rosewell and he has remained a partner as of December 2015.

He is the President of Rochdale Hornets RLFC.

He was interviewed for the BBC's documentary High Anxieties – The Mathematics of Chaos. The video, directed by David Malone, was about unpredictability in the economy and the environment.

Ormerod was the Labour Party candidate for Huntingdonshire in the February 1974 General Election. A Eurosceptic, in the 1990s he was a member of the Labour Euro Safeguards Campaign. He is a supporter of Brexit.

Opinions
He believes shale fracking should not be opposed by environmentalists and that top-down measures are ineffective at reducing environmental harm. He has argued that capitalism and the profit motive have reduced global inequality.

Bibliography 
Paul Ormerod has written several books, many articles and a blog. His books are:
 The Death of Economics (1994) St. Martin's Press 
 Butterfly Economics: A New General Theory of Economic and Social Behaviour (1998) Faber and Faber, 217 pp. 
 Why Most Things Fail: Evolution, Extinction and Economics Faber & Faber (2005). pp. 225, notes and index. .
 Positive Linking: How Networks Can Revolutionise the World (2012).

See also 
 Steve Keen

References

External links 

 Official website: Paul Ormerod
 Official website: Volterra Partners

1950 births
Living people
Academics of University College London
Alumni of Christ's College, Cambridge
Alumni of St Catherine's College, Oxford
British economists
Labour Party (UK) parliamentary candidates
People from Rochdale